Salvatore Sciascia (Sommatino, May 11, 1919 - Bari, 19 April 1986) was an Italian publisher. He founded a publishing house in 1946 in Caltanissetta.

He found several literary talents early in their careers, including: Leonardo Sciascia, Vicente Aleixandre (Nobel prize in 1997), Pier Paolo Pasolini,  Alberto Bevilacqua, Achille Campanile. He published a portrait of John F. Kennedy before his election as President of the USA, about the series: Profiles.

References

Italian publishers (people)
1986 deaths
1919 births